The 48th Baeksang Arts Awards ceremony was held at the Olympic Hall in Jamil, Seoul on 26 April 2012, and broadcast on jTBC. It was hosted by comedian Lee Hwi-jae and actress Kim Ah-joong.

Winners and nominees 
Complete list of nominees and winners:

(Winners denoted in bold)

Film

Television

References

External links
 

Baeksang
Baeksang
Baeksang Arts Awards
Baek
Baek
2010s in Seoul
2012 in South Korea